Orn-anong, nicknamed Orn (born December 27, 1972 in Chiang Mai, Thailand) is Miss Thailand 1992. She competed in Miss Universe 1992 pageant competition held in Thailand.

Filmography

Television dramas
 1992  (ละครเร่) (Dara Video/Ch.7) as Kratin (กระถิน) with Bodin Duke
 1994 Thawiphop (ทวิภพ) (Dara Video/Ch.7) as Prayong (ประยงค์) 
 1995 Dao Tame Din (ดาวแต้มดิน) (Dara Video/Ch.7) as Parita (Bee) (ปริตตา (บี๋))
 1995 Prasart See Khao (ปราสาทสีขาว) (Dara Video/Ch.7) as  
 1997 Karakade (การะเกด) (Dara Video/Ch.7) as Princess Kedsaree (เจ้าหญิงเกษรี) 
 1997 Niramit (นิรมิต) (Dara Video/Ch.7) as Maturee (Whan) (มธุรี (หวาน) (รับเชิญ)) 
 1997 Mai Yor Tor Morasum (ไม่ย่อท้อมรสุม) (/Ch.5) as 
 1998  (เศรษฐีอนาถา) (TV Thunder/Ch.3) as   
 1999  (พ่อ ตอน เทียนขี้ผึ้ง) (Level 5-Production Tang 6/Ch.5) as Nanfon (น้ำฝน) 
 2000 Nam Pueng Kom (น้ำผึ้งขม) (TV Scene & Picture/Ch.3) as Saengdao (Ar-Eiad) (แสงดาว (อาเอียด)) 
 2000  (/Ch.7) as 
 2002  (/Ch.3) as 
 2003  (/Ch.3) as 
 2003  (/Ch.3) as 
 2003  (/Ch.7) as 
 2003  (/Ch.7) as 
 2005  (/Ch.7) as 

 2016 Puer Tur (เพื่อเธอ) (Exact/One 31) as Darunee Thammapitak (Nee's mother) (ดรุณี ธรรมพิทักษ์ (แม่ของนี)) 
 2017 Ngao Saneha (เงาเสน่หา) (RS/Ch.8) as Ka-Nang (Teelaphab's mother) (คนาง (แม่ของธีรภาพ)) with Kriengkrai Oonhanun
 2017 Rak Nakara (รากนครา) (Act Art Generation/Ch.3) as Khian Jan (นางเขียนจันทร์)   
 2017 Waen Dok Mai 2017 (แหวนดอกไม้) (Keng Kwang Gang/GMM 25) as Dungjai (Waenpetch's mother) (ประนอม (แม่ของแหวนเพชร)) with Nukkid Boonthong  
 2019 Mia Noi (เมียน้อย) (CHANGE2561/GMM 25) as แม่ชลาธรและทานพ (Chalathorn, Thanop's mother) with Kasama Nissaipun  
 2019 Dao Lhong Fah 2019 (ดาวหลงฟ้า) (/Ch.3) as Payom (พยอม)   
 2019 Suparburoot Chao Din (สุภาพบุรุษชาวดิน) (First Class/Ch.7) as Saowapa / Aunt Angkrap (เสาวภา / แม่เลี้ยงอังกาบ)   
 2020 Roy Pah (ร้อยป่า) (Sub Entertainment/Ch.7) as Khun Ying (คุณหญิง (รับเชิญ))   
 2020 Poot Ratikarn (ภูตรัตติกาล) (/Ch.8) as Aunt Tongnoun (แม่เลี้ยงตองนวล)   
 2020 Plerng Nang (เพลิงนาง) (CHANGE2561/Amarin TV) as Riang (Plubpla's mother) (เรียง) with Dilok Thong wattana  
 2021 Wo Ai Ni Tur Tee Ruk (หว่ออ้ายหนี่เธอที่รัก) (JSL Global Media/PPTVHD36) as Mae Mu (แม่หมู)   
 2022 Pom Sanaeha (ปมเสน่หา) (Showit/Ch.3) as Lum Pang (Siriyupang's mother) (ลัมพางค์ (แม่สิริยุพางค์)) with Prakasit Bowsuwan
 2022 Dong Dok Mai 2022 (ดงดอกไม้) (The ONE Enterprise-CHANGE2561/One 31) as Chamaiporn Worasetmetee (Chidsamai's mother) (ชไมพร วรเศรษฐเมธี (รับเชิญ)) 
 20 Bulan Mantra (บุหลันมันตรา) (Bear In Mind Studios/Ch.8) as 
 20 Keb Pandin (เก็บแผ่นดิน) (Paujinjong/Ch.3) as 

Television series
 2008 Love Beyond Frontier (อุบัติรักข้ามขอบฟ้า) (GMMTV/Ch.9) as Orn (อรฤดี ทากาโน่ (อร) (ชื่อเก่า), อรอนงค์ จิตราสุนทร (อร) (ชื่อใหม่))
 2009 Love Beyond Frontier 2 (2009) (อุบัติรักข้ามขอบฟ้า 2) (GMM Grammy-GMMTV/Ch.9) as Orn (อร)
 2017 Fabulous 30: The Series (30 กำลังแจ๋วเดอะซีรีส์) (GMMTV/One 31) as Ja's mother (แม่จ๋า (รับเชิญ)) 
 2017 My Dear Loser Series Part 2 : Monster Romance (2017) (รักไม่เอาถ่าน ตอนที่ 2 Monster Romance) (GMM Grammy-GMMTV/GMM 25) as Pong's mother (แม่ป้อง)
 2019 Bangkok Love Stories 2 Part 3: Rueng Tee Koh (Bangkok รัก Stories 2) (GMM Bravo/GMM 25) as El's mother (แม่ของแอล) 
 2022 Star and Sky: Sky in Your Heart (ขั้วฟ้าของผม) (GMMTV/GMM 25) as Prince's mother (แม่ของปริ๊นซ์ (รับเชิญ)) 
 2022 Club Friday 14: Love & Belief Ep. Love Tragedy (Club Friday the Series Love & Belief ความรักกับความเชื่อ ตอน คนกินแฟน) (CHANGE2561/One 31) as Mukrin's mother (แม่ของมุกรินทร์) 
 2022  (พาย สายน้ำแห่งความฝัน (Voice of Youth)) (D O do multimedia/Thai PBS) as Jaw (Sai Fah, Nawa's mother) (แจว (แม่ของสายฟ้าและนาวา)) with Thanayong Wongtrakul

Film
 2003 Beautiful Boxer (บิวตี้ฟูล บ๊อกเซอร์) (GMM Pictures) as Parinya Charoenphol's mother (แม่ของน้องตุ้ม) with Nukkid Boonthong
 2010 The Little Comedian (บ้านฉัน..ตลกไว้ก่อน (พ่อสอนไว้)) (GMM Tai Hub) as Cheun (Tok's mother) (ชื่น) with Jaturong Mokjok
 2013 First Love (2013) (First Love รักครั้งแรก) (Sahamongkol Film) as Pim (Pak Bung's mother) (พิมพ์ (แม่ของผักบุ้ง))
 2020 Rak Kham Kan (2020) (รักข้ามคาน) (Miss Grand International) as 

MC
 1996  (รายการ ยุทธการเด็ดดอกฟ้า) (Ch.9) 
 1997  (รายการ กินกับเกม) (Ch.5) (1997-1998)
 2000  (รายการ ป๊อก ป๊อก ป๊อก) (Kantana Group/Ch.7) with Saitharn Niyomkarn, Claudia Chakrabandhu Na Ayudya, Tik Shiro (2000-2001)
 2018  (รายการ Mom club) (MCOT/MCOT Family) with Took Chanokwanun Rakcheep (2018-2019)

References 

1972 births
Orn-anong Panyawong
Living people
Orn-anong Panyawong
Miss Universe 1992 contestants
Orn-anong Panyawong
Orn-anong Panyawong
Orn-anong Panyawong
Orn-anong Panyawong
Orn-anong Panyawong
Orn-anong Panyawong
Orn-anong Panyawong
Orn-anong Panyawong